Andrew David Lobbenberg (born April→June 1966 in Shrewsbury), an alumnus of Balliol College, Oxford is a former British rower. He was the cox for the winning Oxford team in the Boat Races of 1987 and 1988.

References

External links
Photo of Andrew Lobbenberg (Cox) and Gavin Stewart (Stroke) in the 1987 Boat Race

Living people
1966 births
Oxford University Boat Club rowers
British male rowers